Ites colasi is a species of beetle in the family Cerambycidae. It was described by Lepesme in 1943. It is known from French Guiana.

References

Hemilophini
Beetles described in 1943